Live at Maybeck Recital Hall, Volume Six is an album of solo performances by jazz pianist Hal Galper, recorded in 1990.

Music and recording
The album was recorded in July 1990 at the Maybeck Recital Hall in Berkeley, California. Galper commented that, "I was approaching it with a perfectionist attitude, like I had to have everything worked out. And I was getting more and more uptight about it. So I threw all my plans out the window! I went in with 20 or 25 songs that I had sort of done things on, and I winged it!"

Release and reception

Live at Maybeck Recital Hall, Volume Six was released by Concord Records. The AllMusic reviewer commented that "Galper goes about each task armed with a keen rhythmic sense and a fount of harmonic knowledge." The Penguin Guide to Jazz concluded that "Galper's touch is exact; the ideas come unimpeded but rarely glibly. There is, though, a lack of any real drama, and the set doesn't repay repeated listening."

Track listing
"Spoken Introduction"
"Whisper Not"
"It Never Was You"
"All God's Chillun Got Rhythm"
"A Kiss to Build a Dream On"
"Willow Weep for Me"
"The Touch of Your Lips"
"Bemsha Swing"
"Detour Ahead"
"Airegin"

Personnel
Hal Galper – piano

References

1990 live albums
Albums recorded at the Maybeck Recital Hall
Concord Records live albums
Solo piano jazz albums